Canalization may refer to:
 Canalization, the process of introducing weirs and locks to a river so as to secure a defined depth suitable for navigation
Channelization, the process of modifying a stream so it follows a restricted path
Canalisation (genetics), a measure of the ability of a genotype to produce the same phenotype regardless of variability of its environment
Canalization (psychology) (canalizing), the form of satisfaction or discharge, the term established by Pierre Janet and Gardner Murphy